In Ireland, the highest category of road is a motorway (mótarbhealach, plural: mótarbhealaí), indicated by the prefix M followed by a one- or two-digit number (the number of the national route of which each motorway forms a part). The motorway network consists entirely of motorway-grade dual carriageways and is largely focused upon Dublin. There are also several three-lane motorways, while Ireland's busiest road, the M50, incorporates four-lane,  five-lane, and six-lane stretches.

The completion of the Major Inter-Urban Motorway Project in December 2010, which saw Dublin connected to the cities of Cork, Limerick, Waterford and Galway by continuous motorway, as well as a number of other projects, increased the total length of the country's motorway network to 916 km. Planned new road construction will possibly lead to there being almost 1100 km of motorway by 2035, subject to the availability of funding.

Features

Regulations
Motorways in Ireland have a set of restrictions, which prohibit certain traffic from using the road. The following classes of traffic are not allowed on Irish motorways:

Learner drivers
Slow vehicles (i.e. not capable of reaching 50 km/h (30 mph) on a level road)
Invalid carriages (lightweight three-wheeled vehicles)
Pedestrians
Pedal-cycles (bicycles, etc.)
Vehicles under 50cc (e.g. mopeds)
Vehicles without pneumatic tyres
Animals

Rules for driving on motorways include the following:
The keep-left rule applies unless overtaking
No stopping at any time
No reversing
No hitchhiking
Only vehicles that can travel faster than 90 km/h (55 mph) may use the outside lane
No driving on the hard-shoulder

The general motorway speed limit is 120 km/h (75 mph).

Specification
For more on motorway specification in general, view this motorway article.

Motorways in Ireland are generally constructed to high-quality dual carriageway standard – with sightlines, curves and elevation designed for 120 km/h speeds. Until recently, all motorways were built with wide medians in the centre, which typically have a wire or steel barrier with a continuous hedge growing and covering it over time. The more recent schemes have narrow medians, only 3 metres in width, with a concrete barrier in the middle. These narrow-median schemes also have reduced carriageway width – a typical narrow-median motorway cross section has two 3.5-metre running lanes, a 2.5-metre hard shoulder and a 1.5-metre central reserve in each direction whereas a typical wide median motorway has 3.75-metre running lanes and a 3-metre hard shoulder. Ireland has only a small amount of D3M (motorway with three lanes in each direction). The M50 is the most notable example, having been upgraded in parts from a two-lane motorway, to a three or four lane motorway in each direction.

Apart from terminal junctions, motorways can only be accessed using grade-separated junctions. These typically take the form of roundabout interchanges for higher-capacity junctions, or dumbbell interchanges – which are a variant on the diamond-style interchange. – for lower-trafficked interchanges. A number of other types of junction are also used on the motorway network. The M4/M6 and M7/M9 junctions use a variant of the trumpet-style interchange while the M50/N7 and M50/N4 interchanges use partial cloverleaf junctions.

Safety

Motorways in Ireland include several safety features not found on other classes of road. The most notable include the presence of a continuous hard-shoulder, use of crash barriers, superior lighting and provision of emergency phones at regular intervals. Some motorway schemes include deflectors to provide protection at interchanges.

Signage

Motorway signage in Ireland is blue, and is similar in design to UK signage. Route numbers use the Motorway typeface, and text uses an Irish variant of the Transport Medium typeface (officially described as italic, but more correctly oblique).

Route number inheritance

In Ireland all motorways form part of a national route. The M50 was the only motorway that initially did not form part of an existing national primary route, though it was designated as the national primary route N50 in 1994.

In most cases, motorways have been built as a by-pass of a road previously forming the national road (e.g. M7 by-passing roads previously forming the N7). The by-passed roads are then generally reclassified as regional roads. Under Irish legislation (the Roads Act 1993), motorways are sections of roads with special regulations and they are signposted with the M prefix to indicate that they are under motorway regulations.

Present network

The following table shows a list of motorways currently open in Ireland.

History

1983–1989
In 1983, the first sections of Irish motorway were opened: a short section of M7 bypassing Naas and the first stretch of M1 (all of which has now been redesignated M50). The M1 was later extended in 1985 to Dublin Airport.

1990–1999
Ireland's motorway network began to expand significantly between 1990 and 1999. The first of the projects completed in this period was the western section of the M50, linking the N7, N4 and N3 together in 1990. This was quickly followed by the M11 Bray/Shankill bypass in 1991. After this there followed a lull in construction after what had been a busy few years in motorway construction by then Irish road building standards. 1993 saw an extension to the M7, continuing from the Naas Bypass and providing a bypass of the town of Newbridge, as well as the M9 Kilcullen spur. In addition, another small section of M1, a bypass of Dunleer in County Louth was opened. The Leixlip to Kilcock motorway was completed in 1994, forming part of the M4. In 1995 there were no new motorways opened and in 1996 only the northern section of the M50 was opened, linking the existing motorway to the N2 and M1. The Portlaoise bypass opened as M7 in 1997 and like the M1 Dunleer bypass, seemed very isolated compared to the rest of the network which was concentrated around Dublin. 1998 featured the opening of another short piece of M1, this time to the south of Balbriggan, modern day junctions 5 and 7. In 1999 however, there were no new sections of motorway opened.

2000–2010

The first decade of the twenty-first century saw a major expansion in the construction of new motorways in Ireland, after an initially slow start. There were no new motorways opened in 2000 but another section of the M1, extending the Dunleer bypass northwards to the south of Dundalk (junction 16), and the M50 Southern Cross Route were opened in 2001. Continuing the quiet period, 2002 also saw no new motorway in Ireland, but 2003 was a big year. Finally the various sections of M1 were joined, creating continuous motorway from Dublin to just south of Dundalk. A huge part of this route was the Drogheda bypass which was tolled. Also in 2003, the M7 was extended westwards from Newbridge to also bypass Kildare (up to modern day junction 14). A year later in 2004 and this had been extended further with the opening of the Monasterevin bypass to link up with the Portlaoise bypass. This meant there was now a continuous motorway from Naas to Portlaoise.

By 2005, projects were beginning to be completed faster and in this year the M4 was extended from Kilcock to Kinnegad, this section of motorway having a toll applied to it, one of the first PPP schemes to be tried out in Ireland. The M1 Dundalk bypass was also finished, meaning that there was now a full motorway link on the Dublin to Belfast route virtually as far as the border. Finally in 2005, the M50 was extended to link up to the M11, providing a full western bypass of the capital. In 2006, the M8 Fermoy to Watergrasshill motorway was opened, another section that was tolled. Also a section of what would become M6 was completed, going westwards from the M4 at Kinnegad to Tyrrellspass, the road was opened as N6 and was the first section of road to be completed that would be affected by the Roads Act 2007 and motorway redesignation. In 2007 the same road was extended by some 10 km (6 miles) to join with the N52 north of Tullamore, still opened as N6 as the first tranche of motorway redesignations had only just been submitted.

2008 was one of the most important years for Irish motorways, with a large section of M8 opened, making it the longest motorway in the country. Stretching from Urlingford to just east of Mitchelstown, the motorway opened in various sections, the first being the Cashel bypass, which opened in 2004, and which was followed by the Cashel to Mitchelstown section, both of which were open before the redesignation to motorway came into effect on 24 September 2008. The Urlingford to Cashel section opened later on in the year and so became motorway immediately. Also opened in 2008 was the M9 Carlow bypass which was also open to traffic before the redesignation came into effect. Finally, the M6 was extended to the Athlone bypass and Ireland's motorway network was greatly expanded.

2009 was another major milestone in the development of the Irish motorway network, with many projects under construction finished by the end of the year. Redesignation of High-Quality Dual-Carriageway sections of National Primary routes to motorway took effect on 28 August 2009, further expanding the network. On 18 December 2009 the M6 was opened (Dublin-Galway direct). It is 194 km (120 miles) of motorway. The M9 (linking Dublin to Carlow) was opened on Monday 21 December 2009 and was expanded in March 2010 to link Dublin to Waterford directly. The M9 was fully completed with the opening of the Carlow to Knocktopher section on 9 September 2010.

2010:
M3: 61 km (38 miles) of motorway in County Meath opened on 4 June 2010.

M7: Nenagh – Limerick, 38 km (24 miles) long, opened in three stages, being fully opened on 28 September 2010.

M7: Limerick – Shannon motorway tunnel, 10 km (6 miles) long, opened ahead of schedule on 27 July 2010.

M7: Castletown – Nenagh, 36 km (22 miles) long, opened 22 December 2010.

M7/M8: Portlaoise – Castletown, Portlaoise to Cullahill, 40 km (25 miles), opened on 28 May 2010.

M9: Carlow – Knocktopher, 40 km (25 miles) long, opened 9 September 2010.

M9: Knocktopher – Waterford, 24 km (15 miles) long, opened 22 March 2010.

M50: improvements for Dublin, completed August 2010, but expected earlier.

M18: Crusheen and Gort, 22 km (14 miles), opened 12 November 2010.

Motorway redesignation (tranche 1)
The Roads Act 2007 was passed into law in mid-2007. This Act makes provision for the redesignation of suitable dual carriageways to motorway status. The National Roads Authority made formal applications under Section 8 of the Act to the Minister for Transport on 16 October 2007 regarding dual carriageways which the authority believed to be suitable for redesignation as motorways.

On 29 January 2008, the Department of Transport published notice of the Minister's intention to make the orders being sought and invited submissions or observations to be made to the Minister regarding the NRA's applications.

The consultation procession lasted until 28 March 2008. On 17 July 2008 the statutory instrument redesignating the roads as motorways was signed, and any open parts of these roads have officially become motorways as of 24 September 2008. The Carlow bypass and Kilbeggan-Athlone roads opened with motorway signage but with temporary 100 km/h (60 mph) general speed limits between their opening and their official re-designation as motorways.

The following sections were redesignated:

Motorway redesignation (tranche 2)

On 30 September 2008, the NRA announced its second tranche of proposed motorway redesignations. The closing date for submissions was 14 November 2008 and the Statutory Instrument reclassifying the roads as motorways was made on 2 July 2009, taking effect from 28 August 2009.

The following schemes were included:

On the N6, the Athlone bypass had also been included in the proposed redesignations. However, the final order (the Roads Act 2007 (Declaration of Motorways) Order 2009) did not include this section. However, the section of the N9 road between Powerstown and Waterford, which had been proposed as part of the first tranche but not included in the final order, was included in this order.

Inter-urban motorways
Linking Dublin to regional cities. These motorways are:
 M1 – linking Dublin with Dundalk (and dual carriageway to link in with Northern Irish motorway network)
 M6 (via M4) – linking Dublin with Galway (Officially opened, 18 December 2009 and the first city to city motorway in Ireland)
 M7 – linking Dublin with Limerick
 M8 – linking Dublin with Cork
 M9 – linking Dublin with Waterford (completed 9 September 2010)

All sections of these motorways were completed by the end of 2010. The completion of these schemes added more than 300 km (200 miles) of motorway to the network at the time.

2015–present

Atlantic Corridor

Under the government's Transport 21 initiative, Letterkenny will be linked to Waterford and Cork with new high quality roads – collectively known as the "Atlantic Corridor". While it is anticipated much of this scheme will be constructed as either 2+2 dual carriageway or higher quality single-carriageway – a significant portion of it is expected to be constructed as motorway. 

 The M20 scheme linking Cork with Limerick (the state's second and third largest urban areas), will provide a complete connection between the two cities. It will be approximately 90 km (56 miles) in length. Its construction was given the final go-ahead on 13 October 2017. 
 The final M18 scheme connecting Gort to the M6 near Galway city opened ahead of schedule on 27 September 2017. 
 The construction of the M17 was bundled with the final M18 component and also opened on 27 September 2017. The two motorways meet at Rathmorrissey Interchange, Co. Galway.

Other motorways
On 18 July 2019, the M11 Enniscorthy bypass was opened. A scheme to widen the M7 from two to three lanes in each direction from the beginning of the Naas bypass, at junction 9, to the M7/M9 merge near Newbridge, junction 11, was completed in November 2019.

A motorway project, the Dublin Outer Orbital Route, may be progressed in the future. It is possible that a motorway will be built to the north of Cork City to link the existing N22, N20 and M8 routes: this route, if built, will most likely be designated as the N40. Other potential motorways include a possible extension of the M4 from Mullingar to Longford and the Galway City Outer Bypass which may be built as an extension to the M6.

The Cork to Ringaskiddy road improvement scheme, originally envisaged as dual-carriageway, will now proceed as a motorway scheme.

The planned Adare – Rathkeale dual carriageway, being progressed as part of the Limerick to Foynes improvement scheme, may proceed as a motorway scheme.

Motorway service areas
This is a list of motorway service stations operating in Ireland.

TII is building a series of service areas across the motorway network to provide for safe rest areas. The first of these opened on 15 September 2010 on the M1 at Lusk.

Tranche 4 Motorway Services were announced in 2016 and are proposed for the following locations:
M3 – Dunshaughlin
M6 – Oranmore (also accessible from M17/M18)
M18 – Newmarket-on-Fergus

The following sites have also been proposed:

M20 – Charleville
M28 – TBD
N69 – TBD

Originally, service areas were to be located at 12 locations, but a recent An Bord Pleanála decision ruled that a service area to be located at Rathmorrissey at an M6 junction be removed from an adjacent scheme.

It is anticipated that service areas will be provided on both the M3 motorway and the proposed M20 and M28 motorways.

See also
Roads in Ireland
List of motorways in Northern Ireland
National primary road
National secondary road
Regional road
Local roads in Ireland
Atlantic Corridor
Dublin Port Tunnel
Jack Lynch Tunnel
History of roads in Ireland
Trunk roads in Ireland
National Roads Authority
Road signs in Ireland
Road speed limits in the Republic of Ireland
Vehicle registration plates of the Republic of Ireland
Northern Irish Vehicle Registration Plates
Transport in Ireland
List of Ireland-related topics
List of controlled-access highway systems
Evolution of motorway construction in European nations

References

 
Motorways in
 
Republic of Ireland transport-related lists

de:Straßensystem in Irland
ga:Bóithre agus mótarbhealaí in Éirinn
gv:Raaidyn ayns Pobblaght Nerin
it:Strade irlandesi